A slumber party is a colloquialism for a sleepover.

Slumber Party may also refer to:

Film and television
 "Slumber Party" (Bob's Burgers), the ninth episode of the fourth season of Bob's Burgers
 "Slumber Party", an episode from The Buzz on Maggie
 "Slumber Party", an episode from The Berenstain Bears
 "Slumber Party", an episode from Rugrats

Music
 "Slumber Party" (song), a 2016 song by Britney Spears featuring Tinashe
 "Slumber Party", a song by Nicki Minaj featuring Gucci Mane from the mixtape Beam Me Up Scotty, 2009
 "Slumber Party", a song by Ashnikko featuring Princess Nokia from the mixtape Demidevil, 2021

Other uses
 Slumber Party, a 1985 young adult debut novel by Christopher Pike